Home automation software is software that facilitates control of common appliances found in a home, office, or sometimes a commercial setting, such as lights, HVAC equipment, access control, sprinklers, and other devices. It usually provides for scheduling tasks, such as turning sprinklers on at the appropriate time, and event handling, such as turning lights on when motion is detected. Typically the application will support multiple interfaces to the outside world, such as XMPP, email, Z-Wave, and X10.

The user interface of home automation software is often based on a client-server model, such as a web UI or a smartphone app, or some combination thereof. More advanced applications will allow users to write scripts in a programming language to handle more complex tasks. There are currently many competing home automation standards for both hardware and software.

Open-source software 
This is a list of software across multiple platforms which is designed to perform home automation.

Closed-source software

Proprietary hardware 

This is a list of platforms that require custom, closed hardware for home automation.

References

Lists of software